Quick on the Trigger is a 1948 American Western film directed by Ray Nazarro and written by Elmer Clifton. The film stars Charles Starrett, Smiley Burnette, Lyle Talbot, Helen Parrish, George Eldredge and Ted Adams. The film was released on December 2, 1948, by Columbia Pictures.

Plot

Cast          
Charles Starrett as Steve Warren / The Durango Kid
Smiley Burnette as Smiley
Lyle Talbot as Garvey Yager
Helen Parrish as Nora Reed
George Eldredge as Alfred Murdock
Ted Adams as Martin Oaks
Alan Bridge as Judge Kormac 
Russell Arms as Fred Reed
M.H. Richman as Band Member 
Freddie Daniel as Band Member 
Eddie Wallace as Band Member 
J.D. Sumner as Band Member

References

External links
 

1948 films
1940s English-language films
American Western (genre) films
1948 Western (genre) films
Columbia Pictures films
Films directed by Ray Nazarro
American black-and-white films
1940s American films